This is a links page to the named waterfalls found in Switzerland.

List of waterfalls

 
Waterfalls
Switzerland
Waterfalls